Samford Village is a rural locality in the Moreton Bay Region, Queensland, Australia. It is one of two localities in the town of Samford, the other being Samford Valley. The town’s urban area occupies much of the land of the locality.

History 
In 1981, the locality of Samford was split into two localities: Samford Village around the town and Samford Valley wrapping around the village to the west, north, and east.

Education 
Samford State School is a government primary (Prep-6) school for boys and girls at School Road. In 2018, the school had an enrolment of 850 students with 61 teachers (52 full-time equivalent) and 37 non-teaching staff (23 full-time equivalent). It includes a special education program.

There is no secondary school in Samford. The nearest  government secondary school is Ferny Grove State High school in Ferny Grove to the south-east.

Community groups 
The Samford branch of the Queensland Country Women's Association meets at the QCWA Hall at 31 Main Street.

The Samford Support Network is a group of volunteers providing a variety of services to community members who are ill, elderly, living with a disability, or struggling.

References

Further reading

External links 

 

Suburbs of Moreton Bay Region
Localities in Queensland